Sabrina Impacciatore (born 29 March 1968) is an Italian actress.

Life and career 
Born in Rome to parents from Abruzzo and Sardinia, Impacciatore studied acting at the Actors Studio in New York and enrolled several other acting courses in Rome. She debuted as a comedian and singer in the Gianni Boncompagni's television shows Non è la RAI and Macao. She also appeared as an impersonator in several variety shows.

Impacciatore made her film debut in 1999, in Francesco Maselli's Il compagno. In 2007 she was nominated for a David di Donatello Award for Best Supporting Actress thanks to her performance in Paolo Virzì's 2006 film Napoleon and Me, and one year later she received a second nomination for the same award for Wilma Labate's 2007 film Miss F.

In 2022, Impacciatore starred as Valentina in the second season of the HBO anthology series The White Lotus. She and the rest of the cast won the Screen Actors Guild Award for Outstanding Performance by an Ensemble in a Drama Series in 2023.

Filmography

Film

Television

Music videos

References

External links
 

Italian film actresses
Italian television actresses
Italian stage actresses
21st-century Italian actresses
1968 births
Actresses from Rome
Living people
Italian comedians
People of Abruzzese descent
Italian television personalities
Actors Studio alumni